Op zoek naar Evita (Looking for Evita) was a 2007 talent show-themed television series produced by the AVRO in the Netherlands. It documented the search for a new, undiscovered musical theatre performer to play the role of Eva Peron in the 2008 Andrew Lloyd Webber musical Evita.

The show was hosted by Frits Sissing who announced Brigitte Heitzer as the winner of the final public telephone vote on 21 October 2007 and masterminded by Willem Nijholt.

It became the first of a series of the Dutch themed talent contests to be produced by the AVRO in collaboration with Willem Nijholt. Op zoek naar Joseph followed in 2008 to find a new male lead to play Joseph for Joseph and the Amazing Technicolor Dreamcoat, In 2009, it was followed by Op zoek naar Mary Poppins searching for a new lead to play Mary Poppins in a production of the musical Mary Poppins, In 2010, it was followed by Op zoek naar Zorro searching for a new lead to play Zorro in a production of the musical Zorro, Ten years later in 2021, it was followed by Op zoek naar Maria searching for a new lead to play Maria in a production of the musical The Sound of Music. In 2022, it was followed by Op zoek naar Danny & Sandy searching for a new lead to play Danny & Sandy in a production of the musical Grease.

Format

Expert panel
To assess and train the potential Evitas and judge them during the live shows, an expert panel was chosen. The panel included:
 Willem Nijholt – actor and singer.
 Peter Van de Velde – Flemish actor from Belgium
 Erwin van Lambaart – (managing director of Joop van den Ende theatre)
 Pia Douwes – (musical theatre actress who is very successful in Europe)

Live finals
The final ten contestants competed in the live studio finals held on Sunday nights over eight weeks. Each week the contestants sang and performed during the live show, receiving comments from the judges following their performance. The public then got a chance to vote for their favourite Evita, and the two contestants with the fewest votes performed a sing-off in front of Nijholt, who then decided which Evita to keep in the contest. This was repeated with the top ten, the top nine, the top eight, the top seven, the top six, the top five and the top four.

Nijholt had no say in the final casting decision, when in the concluding edition of the series it was left to the public to choose who should play Evita out of the final two contenders, Brigitte Heitzer and Suzan Seegers. After more votes were cast, the winning entrant was revealed as Heitzer, who won a contract to play Evita at the Nieuwe Luxor Theater in Rotterdam.

Finalists
Ten potential Evitas made it through the auditions process to perform during the live shows.

* at the start of the contest

Results summary

Live shows
The live shows saw the finalists eliminated one by one following both individual and group performances. Once eliminated, the leaving contestant ended the programme by receiving a suitcase and leading a performance of "Dag en bedankt nog (Goodnight and Thank You)\Jij blijft bij mij (You Must Love Me)" from Evita with the remaining contestants.

Week 1 (September 2, 2007)
Following the first week of competition, Tineke was the first Evita to be eliminated from the competition. The show performances were:

Group performances:
"Dreamgirls" (from Dreamgirls)
"Rhythm of the Night" (DeBarge)

Jury's favourite Evita:
Erwin van Lambaart: Suzan (but revealed that his other favourite was Marjolein, but was positive about Suzan)
Pia Douwes: Suzan
Peter Van de Velde: Brigitte
Sing-off:
Tineke Blok and Sophie Veldhuizen were in the sing-off, and performed "I Don't Know How to Love Him" from the musical Jesus Christ Superstar.
Willem Nijholt chose to save Sophie and say "Goodnight and Thank You" to Tineke.

Week 2 (September 9, 2007)
Sabina was the second contestant to be eliminated from the series. The show performances were:

Group performances:
"Diamonds Are a Girl's Best Friend" (from Gentlemen Prefer Blondes)
"Can't Help Falling in Love" (Elvis Presley)

Jury's favourite Evita:
Erwin van Lambaart: Marleen
Pia Douwes: Wieneke
Peter Van de Velde: Sabina
Sing-off:
Anne  Stalman and Sabina Petra were in the sing-off, and performed "Memory" from Cats.
Willem Nijholt chose to save Anne and say "Goodnight and Thank You" to Sabina.

Week 3 (September 16, 2007)
The third potential Evita to be eliminated was Sophie. The show performances were:

Group performances:
"Get the Party Started" (Pink)
"Mijn pakkie an (My Strongest Suit)" (from Aida)

Jury's favourite Evita:
Erwin van Lambaart: Suzan
Pia Douwes: Marleen
Peter Van de Velde: Wieneke
Sing-off:
Sophie Veldhuizen and Anne Stalman were in the sing-off, and performed "Beauty and the Beast" from the same title.
Willem Nijholt chose to save Anne and say "Goodnight and Thank You" to Sophie.

Week 4 (September 23, 2007)
Babette became the fourth contestant to hear she was not Evita. The show performances were:

Group performances:
"We Go Together" (from Grease)
"Take a Chance on Me" (from Mamma Mia)

Jury's favourite Evita:
Erwin van Lambaart: Babette
Pia Douwes: Babette
Peter Van de Velde: Babette
Sing-off:
Babette Holtman and Wieneke Remmers were in the sing-off, and performed "Heel alleen (On My Own)" from Les Misérables.
Willem Nijholt chose to save Wieneke and say "Goodnight and Thank You" to Babette.

Week 5 (September 30, 2007)
Wieneke became the fifth contestant to hear she would not be Evita. The show performances were:

Group performances:
"Don't Stop Me Now" (from We Will Rock You)
"Rainbow High" (from Evita)
"It's the Hard Knock Life" (from Annie)

Jury's favourite Evita:
Erwin van Lambaart: Marjolein (but also very positive about Suzan being his favourite)
Pia Douwes: Marjolein
Peter Van de Velde: Marjolein
Sing-off:
Wieneke Remmers and Anne Stalman were in the sing-off, and performed "Thuis (Home)" from The Wiz.
Willem Nijholt chose to save Anne and say "Goodnight and Thank You" to Wieneke.

Week 6 (October 7, 2007)
In the quarter-final, the sixth Evita to be eliminated was Anne. The show performances were:

Group performances:
"Shout" (Lulu)
"Foxtrot (Dutch version)" (from Foxtrot)

Jury's favourite Evita:
Erwin van Lambaart: Marjolein
Pia Douwes: Marleen
Peter Van de Velde: Brigitte
Sing-off:
Marleen van der Loo and Anne Stalman were in the sing-off, and performed "De winnaar krijgt de macht (The Winner Takes It All)" from Mamma Mia.
Willem Nijholt chose to save Marleen and say "Goodnight and Thank You" to Anne.

Week 7 (October 14, 2007)
In the semi-final, the seventh and final Evita to be eliminated was Marleen. The show performances were:

Group performances:
"Dance: Ten; Looks: Three" (from A Chorus Line)
"Ik ben uitzonderlijk goed voor u (I'd Be Surprisingly Good For You)" featuring Roberto de Groot, who will play as Juan Perón in the upcoming Dutch revival of Evita

Jury's favourite Evita:
Erwin van Lambaart: Suzan
Pia Douwes: Suzan
Peter Van de Velde: Brigitte
Sing-off:
Marleen van der Loo and Marjolein Teepen were in the sing-off, and performed "Één van ons (One of Us)" from Mamma Mia.
Willem Nijholt chose to save Marjolein and say "Goodnight and Thank You" to Marleen.

Week 8 (October 21, 2007)
The grand finale saw Brigitte win the competition, with Suzan coming second and Marjolein third. The show performances were:

Group performance:
Finalists and former Evitas: "There's No Business Like Show Business" (from Annie Get Your Gun)
Finalists: "One Night Only" (from Dreamgirls)
Brigitte and Suzan: "Buenos Aires (Dutch version)" (from Evita)
Brigitte and Suzan: "Huil niet om mij, Argentina (Don't Cry For Me, Argentina)" (from Evita)

Jury's verdict on who is Evita:
Erwin van Lambaart: could not choose between Suzan and Brigitte
Pia Douwes: could not choose between Suzan and Brigitte
Peter Van de Velde: Brigitte
Willem Nijholt: Suzan
After being announced as the series winner, Brigitte concluded the series with a performance of "Huil niet om mij, Argentina (Don't Cry For Me, Argentina)".

After the series
Brigitte Heitzer and several other finalists appeared in a special programme on 25 December 2008 with the winner and finalists from Op zoek naar Joseph titled Kerst met Joseph en Evita (Christmas with Joseph and Evita).

Reception

Awards
On 1 October 2008, it was announced that Op zoek naar Evita was nominated for the Gouden Televizier-Ring 2008, for the best television from the season 2007–2008. On 24 October 2008 showed that this nomination was not silver, the Golden Televizier-Ring was won by Mooi! Weer De Leeuw.

Follow-up
The success of the series lead to it becoming the first of a series of the Dutch themed talent contests produced by the AVRO in collaboration with Nijholt. 2008 saw Op zoek naar Joseph search for a new male lead to play Joseph for a production of Andrew Lloyd Webber's and Tim Rice's Joseph and the Amazing Technicolor Dreamcoat. This was followed in 2009 by Op zoek naar Mary Poppins, which searched for a new lead to play Mary Poppins in a production of the musical Mary Poppins. 2010 saw Op zoek naar Zorro cast Zorro in the forthcoming stage production of Zorro. Ten years later in 2021 saw Op zoek naar Maria cast Maria in the stage production of The Sound of Music. This was followed in 2022 by Op zoek naar Danny & Sandy, which searched for 2 new leads to play Danny & Sandy in a production of the musical Grease.

External links
Official Program Website at avro.nl

Dutch reality television series
Singing talent shows
2000s TV shows in the Netherlands
2007 Dutch television series debuts
2007 Dutch television series endings
NPO 1 original programming